Willi Gerdau (12 February 1929 – 11 February 2011) was a German international footballer. Born in Heide, Gerdau played as a defender for Heider SV, and won one cap for West Germany in 1957 in a match against Scotland. He also competed in the 1956 Summer Olympics.

References

External links
 

1922 births
2011 deaths
German footballers
Germany international footballers
Association football midfielders
Olympic footballers of the United Team of Germany
Footballers at the 1956 Summer Olympics
People from Heide
Footballers from Schleswig-Holstein